The Altcar Bob was a train service introduced in July 1906 by the Lancashire and Yorkshire Railway on the Barton Branch of the Liverpool, Southport and Preston Junction Railway. The Bob was a diminutive steam railmotor: a locomotive attached to a single coach. The coach was supported by only a single bogie at one end, and the locomotive at the other. Remote controls located at the rear of the coach meant that the vehicle did not require turning.

The origin of the term "Bob" is uncertain. Old railwaymen claim that it was named after one of the original drivers, while others insist that this was a common term given to many small locomotives. Another theory is that it relates to the cost of a journey in the early days of the service, "bob" being a slang term for a shilling coin.

The service ceased when the line closed to passengers on 26 September 1938.

The railmotor was one of a class of 18, built for the L&YR between 1906 and 1911. The last survivor (it is unclear if this was the railmotor used for the Altcar Bob) was numbered 10617 by the LMS. Although allocated a new British Railways number of 50617, it never received this and was withdrawn in 1948.

10617 was built in June 1907 at Horwich Works with L&Y works number 18. It was allocated to Bolton Shed (26C) and remained on the Horwich to Blackrod branch line for its entire working life until withdrawn and scrapped at Horwich Works in March 1948. It was affectionately known as the 'Horwich or Blackrod Jerk'.

Notes

References

External links 
 "On The Track of Altcar Bob", written by John Ashcroft 1972
 "Our Ticket to Ride", newspaper article

Railway services introduced in 1906
Railmotors
Lancashire and Yorkshire Railway
Historic transport in Merseyside
Historic transport in Lancashire